Lokomotyv Kharkiv or Lokomotiv Kharkiv may refer to:

 FC Lokomotyv Kharkiv, football club
 MFC Lokomotyv Kharkiv, futsal club
 VC Lokomotyv Kharkiv, volleyball club